This is a list of amphibians and reptiles found on the Caribbean island of Sint Eustatius, part of the Netherlands.

Amphibians
There is one species of amphibian recorded on Sint Eustatius.

Frogs (Anura)

Reptiles
Including marine turtles and introduced species, there are 14 reptile species reported on Sint Eustatius.

Turtles (Testudines)

Lizards and snakes (Squamata)

Notes

References
Note: All species listed above are supported by Malhotra & Thorpe 1999, unless otherwise cited.

.

Amphibians
Sint Eustatius
Sint Eustatius
Sint Eustatius
Sint Eustatius
Sint Eustatius